Calthalotia mundula is a species of sea snail, a marine gastropod mollusk in the family Trochidae, the top snails.

Description
The size of the shell attains 20 mm.  The subperforate shell has an elevated-conical shape. It is whitish, obsoletely painted with longitudinal purplish flammules. The plane whorls are concave in the middle. At the sutures they show a prominent rounded ridge, transversely lirate. The lirae are equal and subgranulose. The base of the shell is concentrically lirate, with radiating striae in the interstices. The aperture is subquadrate. The arcuate lip ends anteriorly in an obtuse tooth. The lip is obsoletely sulcate within.

Distribution
This marine species is endemic to Australia and occurs off Western Australia.

References

 Wilson B. (1993) Australian marine shells. Prosobranch gastropods. Vol. 1. Odyssey Publishing, Kallaroo, Western Australia, 408 pp

External links
 To World Register of Marine Species
 

mundula
Gastropods of Australia
Gastropods described in 1864